Milwaukee Intermodal Station is the main intercity bus and train station in Milwaukee, Wisconsin, located downtown. The station is served by Amtrak's Empire Builder and Hiawatha Service as well as bus companies Coach USA - Wisconsin Coach Lines (regional and intercity services), Greyhound Lines, Jefferson Lines, Indian Trails, Lamers, Badger Bus, Tornado Bus Company, and Megabus.

Milwaukee County Transit System (MCTS) local bus routes 12 and 57 serve the station directly and several other local bus routes operate on nearby streets.

The city's other intercity stations include Milwaukee Airport Railroad Station near Milwaukee Mitchell International Airport on the south side of the city and several other intercity bus stations.

It is Amtrak's 18th-busiest station nationwide, and the second-busiest in the Midwest, behind only Chicago Union Station.

History
The station opened on August 3, 1965 as Milwaukee Union Station. Operated by the Milwaukee Road, it replaced their previous Everett Street Depot. The depot was built on West St. Paul Avenue in a modernistic style that proved unpopular quickly after it was erected. The Chicago and North Western Railroad closed their Milwaukee station (Lake Front Depot) and moved their passenger operations to the new Milwaukee Road depot in 1966. Following the formation of Amtrak in 1971, the Chicago and North Western withdrew all of its intercity trains and commuter service from the station.

In November 2007, the facility was renamed the Milwaukee Intermodal Station following a $16.9 million renovation. The new facility included a larger waiting area with a glass atrium and improved space for Amtrak ticketing, as well as facilities for intercity buses (to accommodate Greyhound service after it relocated from its former location at 7th and Michigan), a restaurant, and retail space. In 2016, the Wisconsin Department of Transportation completed a rebuild of the train shed and platform to meet federal ADA standards.

The Canadian Pacific Railway (through its Soo Line Railroad subsidiary) acquired the trackage within the train shed when it bought the remnants of the Milwaukee Road in 1986 (the Milwaukee went defunct that year). The CP Rail C&M Subdivision runs on two mains through the station. There are 4 depot spurs used to store private railcars and Amtrak Hiawatha trains overnight. CP's Muskego Yard is just to the south of the station.

The Wisconsin Department of Transportation owns the station and platforms. The DOT's Statewide Traffic Operations Center is on the 3rd floor of the station.

There is a 300-space parking lot just west of the station.  The station has a restaurant and a large vending area. Checked baggage service is available for Amtrak passengers.

Services
The station's busiest service is the Hiawatha Service, with seven daily round trips to Chicago (six on the weekends) with an additional late-night southbound train on Fridays. It is the successor of Chicago-Milwaukee express trains operated by the Milwaukee Road from the 1930s onward. The Empire Builder, a long-distance train linking Chicago and the Pacific Northwest, also stops here once a day in each direction, with the eastbound train arriving in early afternoon and the westbound train arriving just before rush hour. Due to the wider availability of the Hiawatha Service, it normally only stops to receive passengers westbound and discharge passengers eastbound. However, for much of the spring of 2020, the Empire Builder temporarily allowed local travel between Chicago and Milwaukee to make up for the suspension of the Hiawatha due to the COVID-19 pandemic.

As of November 2, 2018, the station is served by a stop on The HOP Milwaukee Streetcar.

Statistics

See also
 List of intercity bus stops in Wisconsin

References

External links

Milwaukee Amtrak Station (USA Rail Guide — Train Web)

Amtrak stations in Wisconsin
Bus stations in Wisconsin
Transportation in Milwaukee
Railway stations in the United States opened in 1965
Amtrak Thruway Motorcoach stations in Wisconsin
Buildings and structures in Milwaukee
Former Chicago and North Western Railway stations
Transit centers in the United States
Former Chicago, Milwaukee, St. Paul and Pacific Railroad stations